The damsel in distress is a recurring narrative device in which one or more men must rescue a woman who has either been kidnapped or placed in general peril. Kinship, love, or lust (or a combination of those) gives the male protagonist the motivation or compulsion to initiate the narrative. The female character herself may be competent, but still finds herself in this type of situation. The helplessness of these fictional females, according to some critics, is linked to views outside of fiction that women as a group need to be taken care of by men. The evolution of the trope throughout history has been described as such: "What changes through the decades isn’t the damsel (the woman is always the weak victim in need of the male savior) – it’s the attacker. The faces of the attacker in popular media are legion: monsters, mad scientists, Nazis, hippies, bikers, aliens... whichever group best meets the collective fears of a culture gets the role".

Etymology 
The word "damsel" derives from the French demoiselle, meaning "young lady", and the term "damsel in distress" in turn is a translation of the French demoiselle en détresse. It is an archaic term not used in modern English except for effect or in expressions such as this. It can be traced back to the knight-errant of Medieval songs and tales, who regarded protection of women as an essential part of the chivalric code, which includes a notion of honour and nobility. The English term "damsel in distress" itself first seems to have appeared in Richard Ames' 1692 poem "Sylvia’s Complaint of Her Sexes Unhappiness."

History

Ancient history 

The damsel in distress theme featured in the stories of the ancient Greeks. Greek mythology, while featuring a large retinue of competent goddesses, also contains helpless maidens threatened with sacrifice. For example, Andromeda's mother offended Poseidon, who sent a beast to ravage the land. To appease him Andromeda's parents fastened her to a rock in the sea. The hero Perseus slew the beast, saving Andromeda. Andromeda in her plight, chained naked to a rock, became a favorite theme of later painters. This theme of the princess and dragon is also pursued in the myth of St George.

Post-classical history 
European fairy tales frequently feature damsels in distress. Evil witches trapped Rapunzel in a tower, cursed Snow White to die in Snow White, and put the princess into a magical sleep in Sleeping Beauty. In all of these, a valorous prince comes to the maiden's aid, saves her, and marries her (though Rapunzel is not directly saved by the prince, but instead saves him from blindness after her exile).

The damsel in distress was an archetypal character of medieval romances, where typically she was rescued from imprisonment in a tower of a castle by a knight-errant. Chaucer's The Clerk's Tale of the repeated trials and bizarre torments of patient Griselda was drawn from Petrarch. The Emprise de l'Escu vert à la Dame Blanche (founded 1399) was a chivalric order with the express purpose of protecting oppressed ladies.

The theme also entered the official hagiography of the Catholic Church – most famously in the story of Saint George who saved a princess from being devoured by a dragon. A late addition to the official account of this Saint's life, not attested in the several first centuries when he was venerated, it is nowadays the main act for which Saint George is remembered.

Obscure outside Norway is Hallvard Vebjørnsson, the Patron Saint of Oslo, recognised as a martyr after being killed while valiantly trying to defend a woman – most likely a slave – from three men accusing her of theft.

Modern history

17th century
In the 17th century English ballad The Spanish Lady (one of several English and Irish songs with that name), a Spanish lady captured by an English captain falls in love with her captor and begs him not to set her free but to take her with him to England, and in this appeal describes herself as "A lady in distress".

18th century
The damsel in distress makes her debut in the modern novel as the title character of Samuel Richardson's Clarissa (1748), where she is menaced by the wicked seducer Lovelace.  The phrase "damsel in distress" is found in Richardson's The History of Sir Charles Grandison (1753): 

Reprising her medieval role, the damsel in distress is a staple character of Gothic literature, where she is typically incarcerated in a castle or monastery and menaced by a sadistic nobleman, or members of the religious orders. Early examples in this genre include Matilda in Horace Walpole's The Castle of Otranto, Emily in Ann Radcliffe's The Mysteries of Udolpho, and Antonia in Matthew Lewis' The Monk.

The perils faced by this Gothic heroine were taken to an extreme by the Marquis de Sade in Justine, who exposed the erotic subtext which lay beneath the damsel-in-distress scenario.

One exploration of the theme of the persecuted maiden is the fate of Gretchen in Goethe's Faust. According to the philosopher Schopenhauer:

"The great Goethe has given us a distinct and visible description of this denial of the will, brought about by great misfortune and by the despair of all deliverance, in his immortal masterpiece Faust, in the story of the sufferings of Gretchen. I know of no other description in poetry. It is a perfect specimen of the second path, which leads to the denial of the will not, like the first, through the mere knowledge of the suffering of the whole world which one acquires voluntarily, but through the excessive pain felt in one's own person. It is true that many tragedies bring their violently willing heroes ultimately to this point of complete resignation, and then the will-to-live and its phenomenon usually end at the same time. But no description known to me brings to us the essential point of that conversion so distinctly and so free from everything extraneous as the one mentioned in Faust" (The World as Will and Representation, Vol. I, §68)

19th century
The misadventures of the damsel in distress of the Gothic novel continued in a somewhat caricatured form in Victorian melodrama. According to Michael Booth in his classic study English Melodrama, the Victorian stage melodrama featured a limited number of stock characters: the hero, the villain, the heroine, an old man, an old woman, a comic man and a comic woman engaged in a sensational plot featuring themes of love and murder. Often the good but not very clever hero is duped by a scheming villain, who has eyes on the damsel in distress until fate intervenes to ensure the triumph of good over evil.

Such melodrama influenced the fledgling cinema industry and led to damsels in distress being the subject of many early silent films, especially those that were made as multi-episode serials. Early examples include The Adventures of Kathlyn in 1913 and The Hazards of Helen, which ran from 1914 to 1917. The silent film heroines frequently faced new perils provided by the Industrial Revolution and catering to the new medium's need for visual spectacle. Here we find the heroine tied to a railway track, burning buildings, and explosions. Sawmills were another stereotypical danger of the Industrial age, as recorded in a popular song from a later era:

20th century

During the First World War, the imagery of a Damsel in Distress was extensively used in Allied propaganda (see illustrations). Particularly, the Imperial German conquest and occupation of Belgium was commonly referred to as The Rape of Belgium - effectively transforming Allied soldiers into knights bent on saving that rape victim. This was expressed explicitly in the lyrics of Keep the Home Fires Burning mentioning the "boys" as having gone to help a "Nation in Distress".

A form of entertainment in which the damsel-in-distress emerged as a stereotype at this time was stage magic. Restraining attractive female assistants and imperiling them with blades and spikes became a staple of 20th century magicians' acts. Noted illusion designer and historian Jim Steinmeyer identifies the beginning of this phenomenon as coinciding with the introduction of the "sawing a woman in half" illusion. In 1921 magician P. T. Selbit became the first to present such an act to the public. Steinmeyer observes that: "Before Selbit's illusion, it was not a cliche that pretty ladies were teased and tortured by magicians. Since the days of Robert-Houdin, both men and women were used as the subjects for magic illusions". However, changes in fashion and great social upheavals during the first decades of the 20th century made Selbit's choice of "victim" both practical and popular. The trauma of war had helped to desensitise the public to violence and the emancipation of women had changed attitudes to them. Audiences were tiring of older, more genteel forms of magic. It took something shocking, such as the horrific productions of the Grand Guignol theatre, to cause a sensation in this age. Steinmeyer concludes that: "beyond practical concerns, the image of the woman in peril became a specific fashion in entertainment".

The damsel-in-distress continued as a mainstay of the comics, film, and television industries throughout the 20th century. Imperiled heroines in need of rescue were a frequent occurrence in black-and-white film serials made by studios such as Columbia Pictures, Mascot Pictures, Republic Pictures, and Universal Studios in the 1930s, 1940s and early 1950s. These serials sometimes drew inspiration for their characters and plots from adventure novels and comic books. Notable examples include the character Nyoka the Jungle Girl, whom Edgar Rice Burroughs created for comic books and who was later adapted into a serial heroine in the Republic productions Jungle Girl (1941) and its sequel Perils of Nyoka (1942). Additional classic damsels in that mold were Jane Porter, in both the novel and movie versions of Tarzan, and Ann Darrow, as played by Fay Wray in the movie King Kong (1933), in one of the most iconic instances. The notorious hoax documentary Ingagi (1930) also featured this idea, and Wray's role was repeated by Jessica Lange and Naomi Watts in remakes. As journalist Andrew Erish has noted: "Gorillas plus sexy women in peril equals enormous profits". Small screen iconic portrayals, this time in children's cartoons, are Underdog's girlfriend, Sweet Polly Purebred and Nell Fenwick, who is often rescued by inept Mountie Dudley Do-Right.  On the original Teenage Mutant Ninja Turtles TV series, the television newswoman April O'Neil was repeatedly held captive by the evil Shredder and often needed to be rescued by the titular turtles.

The James Bond novels of Ian Fleming, originally published in the 1950s and 1960s, would sometimes feature the ‘Bond Girl’ tied up by a villain and needing to be rescued by Bond, and this theme continued into a number of the films, produced from the early 1960s onward, including Dr. No, The Spy Who Loved Me, Octopussy, and Spectre, all of which show Bond rescuing the female lead, who has been tied up.  In some films Bond and a female character are tied up together (for example, in Live and Let Die and  Moonraker).   In other films Bond is shown tied up and in peril (examples include  Goldfinger,  You Only Live Twice,  The World Is Not Enough,  Casino Royale and  Skyfall) and in some cases is rescued by the female lead (such as in Licence To Kill and  Spectre).

Frequently cited examples of a damsel in distress in comics include Lois Lane, who was eternally getting into trouble and needing to be rescued by Superman, and Olive Oyl, who was in a near-constant state of kidnap, requiring her to be saved by Popeye.

Critical and theoretical responses 

Damsels in distress have been cited as an example of differential treatment of genders in literature, film, and works of art. Feminist criticism of art, film, and literature has often examined gender-oriented characterisation and plot, including the common "damsel in distress" trope, as perpetrating regressive and patronizing myths about women. Many modern writers and directors, such as Anita Sarkeesian, Angela Carter and Jane Yolen, have revisited classic fairy tales and "damsel in distress" stories or collected and anthologised stories and folk tales that break the "damsel in distress" pattern.

Empowered damsel
Films featuring an empowered damsel date to the early days of filmmaking. One of the films most often associated with the stereotypical damsel in distress, The Perils of Pauline (1914), also provides at least a partial counterexample, in that Pauline, played by Pearl White, is a strong character who decides against early marriage in favour of seeking adventure and becoming an author. Despite common belief, the film does not feature scenes with Pauline tied to a railroad track and threatened by a buzzsaw, although such scenes were incorporated into later re-creations and were also featured in other films made in the period around 1914. Academic Ben Singer has contested the idea that these "serial-queen melodramas" were male fantasies and has observed that they were marketed heavily at women. The first motion picture serial made in the United States, What Happened to Mary? (1912), was released to coincide with a serial story of the same name published in McClure's Ladies' World magazine.

Empowered damsels were a feature of the serials made in the 1930s and 1940s by studios such as Republic Pictures. The "cliffhanger" scenes at the end of episodes provide many examples of female heroines bound and helpless and facing fiendish death traps. But those heroines, played by actresses such as Linda Stirling and Kay Aldridge, were often strong, assertive women who ultimately played an active part in vanquishing the villains.

C.L. Moore's 1934 story "Shambleau" – generally acknowledged as epoch-making in the history of science fiction – begins in what seems a classical damsel in distress situation: the protagonist, space adventurer Northwest Smith, sees a "sweetly-made girl" pursued by a lynch mob intent on killing her and intervenes to save her, but finds her not a girl nor a human being at all, but a disguised alien creature, predatory and highly dangerous. Soon, Smith himself needs rescuing and barely escapes with his life.

These themes have received successive updates in modern-era characters, ranging from 'spy girls' of the 1960s to current film and television heroines. In her book The Devil With James Bond (1967) Ann Boyd compared James Bond with an updating of the legend of St. George and the "princess and dragon" genre, particularly with Dr. No's dragon tank. The damsel in distress theme is also very prominent in The Spy Who Loved Me, where the story is told in the first person by the young woman Vivienne Michel, who is threatened with imminent rape by thugs when Bond kills them and claims her as his reward.

The female spy Emma Peel in the 1960s television series The Avengers was often seen in "damsel in distress" situations. The character and her reactions, portrayed by actress Diana Rigg, differentiated these scenes from other film and television scenarios where women were similarly imperiled as pure victims or pawns in the plot. A scene with Emma Peel bound and threatened with a death ray in the episode From Venus with Love is a direct parallel to James Bond's confrontation with a laser in the film Goldfinger. Both are examples of the classic hero's ordeal as described by Campbell and Vogler. The serial heroines and Emma Peel are cited as providing inspiration for the creators of strong heroines in more recent times, ranging from Joan Wilder in Romancing the Stone and Princess Leia in Star Wars to "post feminist" icons such as Buffy Summers from Buffy the Vampire Slayer, Xena and Gabrielle from Xena: Warrior Princess, Sydney Bristow from Alias, Natasha Romanoff from the Marvel Cinematic Universe, Kim Possible from the series of the same name, Sarah Connor from the Terminator franchise, and Veronica Mars, also from the series of the same name.

Reflecting these changes, Daphne Blake of the Scooby-Doo cartoon series (who throughout the series is captured dozens of times, falls through trap doors, etc.) is portrayed in the Scooby-Doo film as a wisecracking feminist heroine (quote: "I've had it with this damsel in distress thing!"). The 2009 film Sherlock Holmes includes a classical damsel in distress episode, where Irene Adler (played by Rachel McAdams) is helplessly bound to a conveyor belt in an industrial slaughterhouse, and is saved from being sawn in half by a chainsaw; yet in other episodes of the same film Adler is strong and assertive – for example, overcoming with contemptuous ease two thugs who sought to rob her (and robbing them instead). In the film's climax, it is Adler who saves the day, dismantling at the last moment a device set to poison the entire membership of Parliament.

In the final scene of the 2007 Walt Disney Pictures film Enchanted the traditional roles are reversed when male protagonist Robert (Patrick Dempsey) is captured by Queen Narissa (Susan Sarandon) in her dragon form. In a King Kong-like fashion, she carries him to the top of a New York skyscraper, until Robert's beloved Giselle climbs it, sword in hand, to save him.

A similar role reversal is evident in Stieg Larsson's The Girl with the Dragon Tattoo, in whose climactic scene the male protagonist is captured by a serial killer, locked in an underground torture room, chained, stripped naked, and humiliated when his female partner enters to save him and destroy the villain. Still another example is Foxglove Summer, part of Ben Aaronovitch's Rivers of London series - where the protagonist Peter Grant is bound and taken captive by the Queen of the Faeries, and it is Grant's girlfriend who comes to rescue him, riding a Steel Horse.

Another role reversal is in Titanic, directed by James Cameron. After Jack is handcuffed to a pipe in a master-at-arms office to drown, Rose leaves her family to rescue him.

In Robert J. Harris' 2017 WWII spy thriller  The Thirty-One Kings , the chivalrous protagonist Richard Hannay takes time off from his vital intelligence mission to help a beautiful young woman, harassed on a Paris street by two drunken men. She laughingly thanks him though saying she could have dealt with the men by herself. Hannay has no suspicion that she is herself the dangerous Nazi agent he had been sent to apprehend, and that she recognized him and knows his mission. Unsuspectingly he drinks the glass of brandy she offers him - whereupon he loses consciousness and wakes up securely bound. Gloating and jeering, the girl mocks Hannay for his sense of chivalry proving to be his undoing. Destined to an ignominious watery death, it is the would be rescuer who is in very big distress; fortunately, his friends show up in the nick of time to save him from the clutches of the femme fatale.

In video games

In computer and video games, female characters are often cast in the role of the damsel in distress, with their rescue being the objective of the game. Princess Zelda in the early The Legend of Zelda series and who has been described by Gladys L. Knight in her book Female Action Heroes as "perhaps one [of] the most well-known 'damsel in distress' princesses in video game history", the Sultan's daughter in Prince of Persia, and Princess Peach through much of the Mario series are paradigmatic examples. According to Salzburge Academy on Media and Global Change, in 1981 Nintendo offered game designer Shigeru Miyamoto to create a new video game for the American market. In the game the hero was Mario, and the objective of the game was to rescue a young princess named Peach. Peach was depicted as having a pink dress and blond hair. The princess was kidnapped and trapped in a castle by the villain Bowser, who is depicted as a turtle. Princess Peach appears in 15 of the main Super Mario games and is kidnapped in 13 of them. The only main games in which Peach was not kidnapped were in the North America release of Super Mario Bros. 2 and Super Mario 3D World, where she is instead one of the main heroes. Zelda became playable in some later games of the Legend of Zelda series or had the pattern altered.

In the Dragon's Lair game series, Princess Daphne is the beautiful daughter of King Aethelred and an unnamed queen. She serves as the series' damsel in distress. Jon M. Gibson of GameSpy called Daphne "the epitome" as an example of the trope.

See also 

 Courtly love
 Feminist film theory
 Feminist literary criticism
 Feminist science fiction
 Final girl
 Knight-errant
 Literary trope
 Missing white woman syndrome
 Portrayal of women in comics 
 Portrayal of women in video games
 Predicament escape
 Princess and dragon
 Scream queen
 Stock character
 Strong female character
 Women in Refrigerators

References

Bibliography 
 
 Mario Praz (1930) The Romantic Agony Chapter 3: 'The Shadow of the Divine Marquis'
 Robert K. Klepper, Silent Films, 1877-1996, A Critical Guide to 646 Movies, pub. McFarland & Company, 

17th-century neologisms
Sexual fetishism
Distress
Female stock characters
Fictional hostages and kidnapped people
Distress
Tropes